Admiral Cristóbal Colón y de la Cerda, 14th Duke of Veragua, 12th Marquess of Jamaica (8 June 1837 in Madrid – 30 October 1910 in Madrid), was a Spanish Minister of Public Works during the regency of Maria Christina of Austria and Minister of the Navy during the same period and during the reign of Alfonso XIII.

Biography
He was born in Madrid in 1837, and was the eldest son of Pedro Colón y Ramirez de Baquedano, the twelfth Duke of Veragua and María del Pilar-Luisa de la Cerda y-Ghent Vilain, thus making him a direct descendant of famous explorer Christopher Columbus.

The Duke of Veragua began his political career as a deputy of the Province of Ávila in the elections of 1871, was re-elected in the elections of 1872, and in 1876 he was elected deputy in the district of Puerto Rico. In 1878 he was appointed Senator and became Vice President of the Senate.

Colón de la Cerda was Minister of Public Works during the regency of Maria Cristina of Austria and Minister of the Navy during the same period and during the reign of Alfonso XIII. In 1892 he received the Golden Fleece to celebrate the fourth centenary of the discovery of America. He traveled to America in 1893 and visited the Chicago World's Fair. During his ten weeks in America he visited the luxury hotel Prospect House in the Adirondack Mountains of New York state.

In 1897 de La Cerda was elected a member of the American Antiquarian Society.

In March 1900 he was in charge of a special mission sent to Berlin to invest the German Crown Prince Wilhelm with the Order of the Golden Fleece on behalf of King Alfonso XIII.

References

Sources

External links
 

1837 births
1910 deaths
19th-century Spanish nobility
Dukes of Veragua
Politicians from Madrid
Columbus family
Knights of the Golden Fleece of Spain
Members of the American Antiquarian Society